Pitch Black is the sixth EP by Swedish extreme metal band Meshuggah. It was released on 4 February 2013 on Scion AV. Pitch Black is available as a free download from the label's website. The song "Pitch Black" was recorded in 2003.

Track listing

Personnel
Jens Kidman – vocals
 Fredrik Thordendal – guitar, bass ("Pitch Black")
 Mårten Hagström – guitar
 Tomas Haake – drums, vocals ("Pitch Black")
 Dick Lövgren – bass ("Dancers to a Discordant System (live)")

References

Meshuggah albums
2013 EPs
Albums free for download by copyright owner